Hasslers Mill is an unincorporated community in Murray County, in the U.S. state of Georgia.

History
A post office was established at Hasslers Mill in 1836, and remained in operation until 1909. The community was named after one  William Hassler. Variant names are "Hasler Mill" and "Hassler Mill".

References

Unincorporated communities in Murray County, Georgia
Unincorporated communities in Georgia (U.S. state)